Yulia Markova  (born 10 August 1996) is a Russian handball player for CSKA Moscow and the Russian national team.

She was selected to represent Russia at the 2017 World Women's Handball Championship.

References

External links

1996 births
Living people
Russian female handball players
Sportspeople from Volgograd
Handball players at the 2014 Summer Youth Olympics